Belgrade is an unincorporated community in south central Washington County, Missouri, United States. It is located on Missouri Supplemental Route C, approximately five miles (10 km) west of Caledonia and ten miles (16 km) south of Potosi.

History
A post office called Belgrade has been in operation since 1867. The community was named after Belgrade, the capital of Serbia. An early variant name was "Bryanville ".

Geography

Education
Public schools in the Belgrade area are administered by Valley R-6: Caledonia school district.

References

Unincorporated communities in Washington County, Missouri
Unincorporated communities in Missouri